Gajayana Stadium (Stadion Gajayana) is a multi-purpose stadium in Malang, East Java, Indonesia. Gajayana Stadium is the oldest stadium in Indonesia. This stadium began to become the center of the city in 1924 until 1926. Then in the early 1990s Gajayana Stadium renovated, capacity to 17,000. In 2007, the area next to the Gajayana Stadium became MOG or Malang Olympic Garden, completed in 2008. In 2008, Gajayana Stadium was renovated again and its capacity increased to 25,000. It is used mostly for football matches and is home stadium of Persema Malang and Arema.

References

Football venues in Indonesia
Sports venues in Indonesia
Multi-purpose stadiums in Indonesia
Football venues in East Java
Athletics (track and field) venues in East Java
Buildings and structures in East Java
Malang